Santana Productions was a film production company founded in 1948 by Humphrey Bogart. It was named after his yacht (and the cabin cruiser in Key Largo). The company released its films, known for its film noir through Columbia Pictures, but the majority of its motion pictures lost money at the box office, ultimately forcing the sale of Santana.

Feature films

References

Bibliography 
 

Film production companies of the United States

Entertainment companies based in California
Entertainment companies established in 1948
1948 establishments in California
Defunct companies based in Greater Los Angeles
Entertainment companies disestablished in 1955